Atrai River (also spelt as Atreyee) flows in West Bengal and northern parts of Bangladesh.

In ancient times the river was called Atreyee and finds a mention in the Mahabharata, one of the two Sanskrit epics of ancient India.. It is linked with Jorapani river, Fuleswari river, and Karatoya River. It originates in Siliguri ward no 40, near baikanthapur forest  West Bengal and then after flowing through Dinajpur District of Bangladesh, it enters India again. It passes through Kumarganj and Balurghat community development blocks in Dakshin Dinajpur district. The river then renters Bangladesh. It splits into two rivers—the Gabura and the Kankra in Dinajpur district. It crosses the Barind Tract and flows into Chalan Beel. The river serves as a perennial source of fishing, even though it is often the cause of flooding in many areas during monsoons.

Early history

The Atrai was formerly one of the greatest rivers of north Bengal for it was the main channel by which the waters of the Teesta discharged into the Ganges. In 1787, however, the Teesta broke away from its ancient bed and cut for itself a new and capacious channel by which it found its way into the Brahmaputra. Since then the Atrai has lost its importance and has now few traces of its former greatness.

It enters the district from Rajshahi flowing through the Chalan Beel and falls into the Baral near the village of Nurnagar. Formerly, it used to pursue a course to the south and east after leaving the Chalan Beel till it fell into the Jamuna; but the middle portion of this old channel has been obliterated by the Baral and the Ichhamati, which, taking off from the Padma cut across the Atrai and overwhelmed it by copious deposit of silt.

The southern portion of the river in this district can still be traced from its junction with the Ichhamati at Boalmari; it then flows through Dulai and Bera thana and falls into the Padma near Ratanganj. This river presents one of the most striking instances of riverine changes in the district of Pabna.

References

Rivers of Bangladesh
Rivers of West Bengal
Tributaries of the Ganges
International rivers of Asia
Rivers of India
Rivers of Rangpur Division